Heather Cameron is a Canadian and British social theorist and social entrepreneur. She is the Michael B. Kaufman Professor of Practice in Social Entrepreneurship and Innovation at the Brown School at Washington University in St. Louis. From 2008 to 2016 she was a Junior Professor of Physical Activity, Inclusion and Sport at the Department of Education and Psychology at the Free University of Berlin and Professor Extraordinarius at the University of the Western Cape, South Africa.

Career 
Heather Cameron studied philosophy, political science and history in Toronto and Berlin and received her doctorate in 2002 from York University, Canada, in "Social and Political Thought" with a thesis on Michel Foucault, Sigmund Freud and social critique. She held a post-doctoral award from the Canadian Social Sciences and Humanities Research Council at the Center for Technology and Society at the Technische Universitat Berlin. She also taught at the School of Communications at the Simon Fraser University. Vancouver, Canada.

Boxgirls and Sports for Development

Cameron is a leader in the Sport for social development movement. She was a founding member of the "Sport for Social Change Network" in East and South Africa and was an early advisory board member to the international foundation for women's sports "Women Win” Cameron also works with the German International Development Cooperation on behalf of the German and Afghan governments to support girls education and sport in Afghanistan.

The organization "Boxgirls International", which she founded in 2005 has received several awards, including the "Special Prize of the Chancellor" in the StartSocial competition by Chancellor Angela Merkel personally. Cameron helped local activists in Kenya start Boxgirls Kenya and programs in South Africa. Boxgirls has been included as a case study by the IOC and UN Women.

Boxgirls is a project of Camp Group, limited liability charitable organisation, a "Think and Do tank" that offers consulting services and expertise on a variety of topics related to nonprofit, nongovernmental organizations, and social entrepreneurship.

Now, at Washington University in St. Louis, Cameron also manages the Social Entrepreneurship and Innovation Lab.
The lab works on questions of community advancement through entrepreneurship.

Awards 
2010 University Teacher of the Year by German University Association.
2010 Ashoka Fellow
2011 Young Leaders Award BMW
2012 Member of The responsible Bosch Foundation

Selected publications 
Who determines when social entrepreneurs are successful? in Marianne Henkel, Jana Gebauer, Justus Lodemann, Franziska Mohaupt, Lena Partzsch, Eva Wascher, Rafael Ziegler (ed.): Social Entrepreneurship - Status Quo 2009: (Self) image, impact and future responsibility, conference proceedings. Berlin HUB, June 16 and 17, 2009. Geozon Science Media, doi : 10.3285 / g.00003, pp. 111–126, PDF (1.69 MB)
Sport is good! Monitoring sport for social change . In: International - Inclusive - Interdisciplinary. Perspectives of contemporary sports science. Ed .: Heike Tiemann, Sigrun Schulz & Erika Schmidt-Gotz. Schorndorf 2007.
Tracking Buses and Passengers with Intelligent Transport Systems . In: Surveillance and Security: Technological Politics and Power in Everyday Life. New York 2006, 
Directing Traffic: Surveillance in Beijing, Amsterdam, London . In: Alphabet City 10: Supect. Boston: MIT Press 2005.
The Next Generation: visual surveillance in the age of databases and radio labels . In: image, space, control. Frankfurt a. M. 2005.
CCTV and (In) dividuation In: Surveillance & Society. November 2004.
Planning, Design, and Validation Issues in Assistive Technology: State of the Art and New Participative Tools (in collaboration with H – L. Dienel and Alexander Peine). In: Gerotechnology: Research and Practice in Technology and Aging: A Textbook and Reference for Multiple Disciplines. Heidelberg 2004.
Watching the boxer's body . In: sport, staging, event, art. Kiel 2004.
Expert Witnesses as Engaged Intellectuals: A discussion with Janine Fuller of Little Sisters . In: Canadian Woman Studies. May 1996.

References 

Living people
British women social scientists
Washington University in St. Louis faculty
Year of birth missing (living people)
Ashoka USA Fellows